Ánh Minh (born May 16, 1985) is a Vietnamese American singer. She was a member of female duo Puriti before her solo career. She is also known as one of the artists performing in Paris By Night shows.

Background
Ánh Minh and her five siblings, along with her parents, left their home country by boat when Ánh Minh was two. After spending some time in refugee camps, the family settled in California.

Career
Ánh Minh signed with the label Asia Entertainment in 2003, and then Thúy Nga in 2011. She is currently a freelance artist.

Discography

Albums 
 Take Control, released on August 6, 2010
 Mùa Đông Yêu Thương, released  December 9, 2010
 Sunrise, released on June 20, 2013
 Love

References 

1985 births
Living people
Vietnamese emigrants to the United States
21st-century American women singers
21st-century American singers
American women pop singers
21st-century Vietnamese women singers